Bright Amoateng is an English professional footballer who plays for Ghanaian team Nkoranza Warriors SC.

Career
Amoateng began his career as an academy player for Liverpool. By 2019 he had moved to Bury's academy. Due to Bury's expulsion from the Football League on 27 August, he was one of 140 youth players that were released. He played for Bolton's U23 during March 2020 and was signed as a first year scholar on 4 September after a successful trial with the first team during pre-season for the 2020–21 season. He made his competitive debut on 12 September, coming on as a late substitute for Reiss Greenidge in a 0–1 home defeat against Forest Green Rovers in Bolton's first EFL League Two match of the 2020–21 season. He was released in January 2022.

By February 2023 he was playing for Ghanaian team Nkoranza Warriors SC in the Division One League, Ghana.

Career statistics

References

External links
 

Association football forwards
Black British sportspeople
English Football League players
English footballers
Liverpool F.C. players
Bury F.C. players
Bolton Wanderers F.C. players
Living people
2002 births